Berwick Glacier is a tributary glacier,  long, flowing southeast between the Marshall Mountains and the Adams Mountains to enter Beardmore Glacier at Willey Point in Antarctica. It was named by the British Antarctic Expedition, 1907–09, (BrAE) after HMS Berwick, a vessel on which Lieutenant Jameson B. Adams of the BrAE had served. The map of the British Antarctic Expedition, 1910–13, and some subsequent maps transpose the positions of Berwick Glacier and Swinford Glacier. The latter lies  southwestward, and the original 1907–09 application of Berwick Glacier is the one recommended.

References 

Glaciers of the Ross Dependency